The Weishe–Hongguo railway or Weihong railway, is a branch railroad of the Nanning–Kunming railway in Guizhou province of  Southwest China.  The Weihong Line branches off of the main Nankun Line at Weishe Township in Xingyi municipality and runs north to Hongguo Township in Liupanshui municipality, where the line connects to the Pan County West Railway.  The Weishe–Hongguo railway was built as part of the Nankun railway, which was constructed from 1990 to 1997.

Rail connections
 Hongguo: Pan County West Railway
 Weishe (Xingyi): Nanning–Kunming railway

See also

 List of railways in China

References

Railway lines in China
Rail transport in Guizhou
Xingyi, Guizhou